The Gunpowder Plot: Exploding the Legend was a British television show, hosted by Richard Hammond that recreated elements of the Gunpowder Plot in which Guy Fawkes attempted to blow up the House of Lords.

First aired on the ITV Network in 2005, this £1 million programme centres on a reconstruction of the Houses of Parliament as they were in 1605 (the current ones had not yet been built at the time of the Gunpowder Plot), constructed using period equivalent methods wherever possible. This was stocked with mannequins to represent notable commoners, members and the king before the bomb was detonated. The programme was made to coincide with the 400th anniversary of the plot.

Synopsis
The programme explores through partial dramatization the plot itself, and the persons involved. It also answers the question of whether the plot would have actually worked: the Houses of Parliament would have been completely obliterated, and most of the windows in nearby Westminster Abbey would have been shattered.

The first hurdle to overcome was the actual recreation of the 17th-century Houses of Parliament. As the buildings were demolished to expand the current structures, Simon Carter, the Parliamentary Curator provided drawings of the original structures for the recreated structure to utilise using 650 tonnes of concrete. Explosives expert Sidney Alford helped to determine that thirty-six barrels containing one cubic ton of gunpowder were used in the plot. Alford further proved that the "decayed" powder was classified as such because it was unsuitable for infantry use, but could still detonate.

The dramatic experiment, conducted on the Advantica-owned Spadeadam test site and overseen by Arup, proved unambiguously that the explosion would have, at the very least, killed all those attending the State Opening of Parliament in the Lords chamber, including, according to historical consultant Justin Pollard, King James I and VI of Scotland, Archbishop Bancroft, Lord Northampton and the philosopher Francis Bacon.

The power of the explosion, which surprised even gunpowder experts, was such that  solid concrete walls (made deliberately to replicate how archives suggest the walls in the old House of Lords were constructed) were reduced to rubble. Measuring devices placed in the chamber to calculate the force of the blast were themselves destroyed by the blast, while the skull of the mannequin representing King James, which had been placed on a throne inside the chamber surrounded by courtiers, peers and bishops, was found far from the site. According to the findings of the programme, no one within 100 metres of the blast would have survived, and all windows within a large distance of the palace would have been shattered, including the stained glass windows of Westminster Abbey. The power of the explosion would have been heard at least five miles away, and seen from much further. Even if only half the gunpowder had gone off, everyone in the House of Lords and its environs would have been killed instantly. The blast would have been mostly directed upwards, Arup blasting consultant David Haddon, pointed out, raining debris in a 200-meter radius.

The later part of the programme addressed the contrafactual historical aspects, had the plot actually succeeded. Pollard notes that the conspirators ideally planned to use the bombing to create a Catholic monarchy, with Robert Catesby and the Catholics in power while James's nine-year-old daughter, princess Elizabeth, sat on the throne. Pollard speculates that English history would have therefore more closely resembled that of France, and a president would ultimately have been living in Buckingham Palace. However, Pollard points out that, in all likelihood, the result would have been much the same as what actually transpired, with the conspirators caught and executed. Additionally, had the plot succeeded, there would have been a massacre of Catholics, who accounted for 5% of the populace, leaving no Catholics in England at all: "In reality, the blast would have sent shockwaves through the Protestant community, bolstering their resolve against the hugely outnumbered Catholics and sparking ruthless revenge." Pollard concludes that the plot was a "stupid" plan, stating that "you can't change the politics of a whole country just by blowing up a few hundred people".

Cast
Richard Hammond - Host

Justin Pollard - Historical Consultant

Historical dramatization
Henry Douthwaite as Guy Fawkes
Stuart Liddle as King James I
Matt Rozier as Robert Catesby
Jonathan Dunstan as Thomas Winteur
Daniel Hoadley as Thomas Percy
Toby Knight as John Wright
Tallulah Boote Bond as Princess Elizabeth
John Joyce as Father Henry Garnet

Production

When approached with the idea of building a full-size replica of Parliament, stuffing the basement with gunpowder and blowing it up, presenter Richard Hammond considered it a hoax. He "simply did not believe that anyone would be crazy enough to recreate the Gunpowder Plot."

Production, historically and scientifically correct, took six months. While historical research was underway in England, Hammond and explosives expert Sidney Alford had to travel to Spain to buy some gunpowder, as not enough was available in the UK. They were stopped at the French border by customs because, as Hammond recounted, "our expert [unsurprisingly] turned out to be contaminated with traces of just about every form of explosive known to man, triggering a security alert."

Hammond recounts that during filming the 2005 London Bombings put the production in a different frame of reference:

 
Production designer Jo Manser built part of the House of Lords (the Westminster tower) to scale as it was in 1605, and then "blew it up to see if Guy Fawkes would have succeeded 400 years ago". Manser said the set (11m by 23m and 16m high) required a production crew of 45 people, and cost £200k. The set was built between July and September 2005. AP Structural engineers were consulted to assess the equations used building the structure to ensure accuracy and safety. Despite preparations, Manser noted that while sets are eventually discarded, "this was a more exciting way to dispose of it."

For the interior filming, fifteen small digital cameras were used, including PD150s. For the external shots of the explosion, a slow motion camera was used, not the type typically used in television filming. Advanitca used them to study the explosions frame by frame.

Reception

Adam Nicolson of The Guardian wrote in August that the casting of Hammond was "eccentric." Thomas Sutcliffe of The Independent noted with "satisfaction" that the documentary was "irresistible to anyone with a weakness for the delicious combination of immediate spectacle and delayed climax." Sunday Express' Adrian Pettet points out that Gunpowder is "a cross between Mechannibals and Timewatch, it's great fun and there is a bit of proper history smuggled in there too".

References

External links
What If the Gunpowder Plot Had Succeeded?
The History of the Gunpowder Plot (Produced by The Parliamentary Archives)
The Gunpowder Plot of 1605
Catholic Encyclopedia: The Gunpowder Plot
The Gunpowder Plot (Website exploring the history of the plot for younger users)
The Gunpowder Plot (House of Commons Information Sheet)

Anglicanism
British television documentaries
Gunpowder Plot
Historical reenactment events
ITV (TV network) original programming
2005 in British television